Jennifer "JP" Pomnichowski (born January 26, 1967) is an American politician and a Democratic member of the Montana Senate. Pomnichowski served as a member of the Montana House of Representatives from 2007 to 2011 and from 2013 to 2015.

External links
Montana House of Representatives - JP Pomnichowski Official MT State Legislature website
Project Vote Smart - Representative Jennifer 'JP' Pomnichowski (MT) profile

References

1967 births
21st-century American politicians
21st-century American women politicians
Living people
Members of the Montana House of Representatives
Politicians from Great Falls, Montana
Women state legislators in Montana